Venezolana - Linea Aérea de Venezuela RAV S.A. (also known as Venezolana de Aviación) is a Venezuelan low-cost airline headquartered in Maracaibo.

History
The airline was founded by Venezuelan investors in 2001 as RAVSA - Rutas Aéreas de Venezuela S.A.. In 2007, the airline started up operations under its brand name Venezolana. When operations started, Venezolana began to acquire through the years a mixed fleet of used Boeing 737-200, MD-80s and the Bae Jetstreamers in order to start more scheduled services to other destinations inside and outside of Venezuela. During the 2000s, the airline experienced a rapid expansion around the international and domestic market, especially with the regional route between the cities of Maracaibo and Caracas, which is one of the most popular routes in Venezuela.

However, Venezolana had a turmoil with its reputation in the international market between 2009 and 2011, because of delays and cancellations due to mechanical problems, mismanagement in its operation procedures, and ransacking of passengers' baggage. This eventually brought criticism from passengers and as a response, the airline began re-organization procedures which eventually decreased the passenger complaints rate. On February 27, 2012, the Venezuelan Ministry of Transportation indefinitely suspended Venezolana's air operator certificate due to unpaid insurance premiums for the fleet, causing disruptions of the airline's domestic and international operations. However, it was reported that the airline paid the premiums and resumed operations the same day.

In January 2014, due to the Venezuelan government's CADIVI currency-exchange administration making delayed payments to domestic and international airlines, Venezolana had problems with its flights due to lack of available aircraft, since all but one of its aircraft were unairworthy due to inability to buy replacement parts. As a consequence, the National Institute of Civil Aviation decided to again ground the airline, causing disruptions on domestic and international operations indefinitely. On March 26, 2014, the airline was bought by a group of private investors and resumed operations.

Destinations

Venezolana flies to the following cities:

Fleet

Current fleet
, the Venezolana fleet consists of the following aircraft:

Former fleet
Venezolana had in the past operated the following aircraft

Accidents and incidents
On November 18, 2004, a BAe Jetstream 31 (registered YV-1083C) was on a passenger flight when it crashed during a runway excursion at Simón Bolívar International Airport which the runway was wet due to rain. Of the 21 occupants on board, only 2 people were killed. The aircraft was written off and scrapped.
On April 27, 2009, a Boeing 737-200 (registered YV268T) suffered hydraulic problems causing the crew to burn off fuel in a holding pattern and landed back at La Chinita International Airport. None of the 84 occupants were injured while the aircraft was repaired and returned to service.
On May 30, 2019, a Boeing 737-200 (registered YV502T) was flying from Port of Spain to Caracas when the aircraft suffered an engine failure and a subsequent uncontained engine fire. There were no reports of injuries to any of the 80 passengers on board the plane.

See also
List of airlines of Venezuela

References

External links

Official website

Airlines of Venezuela
Airlines established in 2001
Venezuelan brands
Low-cost carriers
Venezuelan companies established in 2001